Yeon Namsan (淵男産, 연남산) (639–701) was the third son of the Goguryeo military leader and dictator Yeon Gaesomun (603?–665).

The course of his career shadowed closely that of his elder brother Yeon Namsaeng. From an early age he was appointed Seonin (선인, 先人), and rising through the ranks of sohyeong (소형, 小兄), daehyeong (대형, 大兄) uidu daehyeong (위두대형, 位頭大兄) and junggun juhwal (중군주활, 中軍主活) (all obscure Goguryeo ranks whose exact nature is unknown.)

Following Yeon Gaesomun's death around 666 Namsan joined forces with his elder brother Yeon Namgeon against their oldest brother Namsaeng, who ultimately fled to Tang China to seek its aid. However, upon the fall of Goguryeo in 668 Namsan submitted to Tang. In Tang Namsan was accorded the office of Vice Minister of the Court of Imperial Entertainments (Sizai shaoqing 司宰少卿).

Following his death from illness he was buried along with his eldest brother in Luoyang. His tomb stele was later discovered in the Tang eastern capital of Luoyang, along with that of Namsaeng.

References 

639 births
701 deaths
Goguryeo people
Tang dynasty politicians
Korean politicians
7th-century Korean people